Keith Sudziarski (born July 20, 1973) is a bobsledder who represented the United States Virgin Islands. He competed at the 1994, 1998 and the 2002 Winter Olympics.

References

External links
 

1973 births
Living people
United States Virgin Islands male bobsledders
Olympic bobsledders of the United States Virgin Islands
Bobsledders at the 1994 Winter Olympics
Bobsledders at the 1998 Winter Olympics
Bobsledders at the 2002 Winter Olympics
Place of birth missing (living people)